David Laurie (b.Netherton 1833 - d. Brussels 1897) -  was a distinguished 19th century violin collector (known worldwide, as  good friend of  J. B. Vuillaume).

Born in 1833 in Netherton, Kinross-shire Scotland, he was an only son of John Laurie laird of Drunzie, Kinross-shire. He married and had six children with his first wife and then after her death married again and had twelve more children.

He was an oil merchant, as well as an amateur violinist, though his passion was fiddle collecting  which eventually changed to his livelihood.
His personal violin was the "Alard" Stradivari of 1715, which he bought from Alard in 1876 (upon his retirement). Prior to that, in the mid-19th century the instrument  was bought  by a banker from Belgium in Florence and subsequently  passed to  J. B. Vuillaume in Paris who gave it to his son-in-law M. Delphin Alard a professor of violin at the  Paris Conservatory.
Mr. Laurie   once  was offered £2,000 for the "Alard" Strad  which he refused.

He amassed a great collection of the finest string instruments in the world. Among the many great instruments which passed through him were:

Antonio Stradivari (STRADIVARIUS) violin(s) of  1684 "Wilmotte", 1688, 1701, 1702, the "Dancla Stradivarius (1703)",  the "Lafont"  of  1708, the "Ernst"of  1709, 1710, 1712, ex- "Marquis de Sayve" of  1713, "Cremonese" now known as the ex-Joachim of 1715, the "Alard" of 1715, 1717, another ex- "Joachim" of 1722, 1726,  The 1734 "Gibson" Viola as well.

Also Stradivari cello(s) the "Gore-Booth" of 1710, and the  "Bass of Spain" of 1713.
Del Gesu "Il Canone", "King Joseph"  Guarnerius Del Gesu, the d'Egville of 1735 and the "Leduc" of 1743/5 Del Gesus, as well one c. 1744.

Other instruments include  an Amati violin of 1688,  Nicolò Amati violin 1645 (sold to J. Joachim), Bergonzi tenor, Bergonzi cello, Lupot violin, Ex- Garcin J.B. Vuillaume of   1868 violin (which he bought from Garcin), and another   Vuillaume violin of  1874 which  showcases inlaid ebony fleur-de-lys designs and is one of the last instruments to come out of Vuillaume's workshop, made a year before his death.
"Made  for the famous violin dealer David Laurie, it's a copy of a Nicolò Amati violin originally belonging to Prince Youssoupoff (a Russian aristocrat and pupil of Henri Vieuxtemps). Only six copies were made."

He conducted his business from his home 36 Lansdowne Crescent, Glasgow. David Laurie died  in Brussels, 1897.

Quotes
"...I will now relate the purchase and sale of a grand Stradivarius violin, which while giving me a good deal of trouble one way and another, also brought me fame as a reliable expert.

To be a good expert requires three important gifts, which must be inborn and yet require to be developed with much study. These three gifts are an unerring eye, a good memory, and a good ear. The first two are absolutely essential to distinguish the work of different makers, and also the work of the same maker in instruments of widely different appearance and of different periods of his life. Instruments by the same maker have invariably certain characteristics of his handiwork, which while unnoticed by ordinary folk, reveal them at once to the expert.

The third gift is not considered by any means necessary to the making of an expert, yet I think I am justified in saying that a good ear plays an important part in the work and is a valuable gift, which ought to be cultivated and developed to its utmost, if it were for nothing else than to be able to distinguish one tone from another and to decide which has the best carrying power and which is in most repute with the majority of musical folk, artistes and amateurs alike.

For after all, to the great majority of concert-goers the tone of a violin is the most important part of it, and they neither know nor care who the maker is so long as the player delights them with its music. In this purchase which I am about to relate I put my ear to a severe test in judging whether a fiddle was likely to be worth purchasing or not and it did not fail me." 
  - The Reminiscences of a Fiddle Dealer was  published three times.  First edition published  in 1900, Third edition was published  by Harold M. Chaitman in 1977.

In discussing violin set up with his clients, David Laurie stated: "Take your violin to a reliable man, and get it mounted and let the mountings alone. Just so surely   as you begin altering this or that you alter the 
tone, and undo the work of some experienced man  who knows his business." If you love your violin, follow this advice and you will not regret it."

References

Bibliography
The Reminiscences of a Fiddle Dealer by David Laurie
Violin Fraud: Deception, Forgery, Theft, and Lawsuits in England and America By Brian W. Harvey
The Voller Brothers: A colour preview - Andrew Fairfax
Published in The Strad magazine Vol. 104 No. 1233  Jan. 1993
 Les Edition Montparnasse
Les Luthiers Parisiens aux XIX et XX siecles Tom 3  "Jean-Baptiste Vuillaume et sa famille : Nicolas, Nicolas-François et Sébastien"   by Sylvette Milliot  published by  Edition les Amis des la Musique 2006
Jost Thöne: J.B.Vuillaume, Bildband mit originalgrossen Abbildungen, Bocholt 1998.
Jean-Baptiste Vuillaume - Violins and Violinists Series of Violin Makers  published by William Lewis and Son
Les Trésors de la Lutherie Française du XIXe siècle", Paris c 1992
The Henry Hottinger Collection, Rembert Wurlitzer, Inc., New York, 1966   Henry Hottinger Collection
Stradivarius - Guarnerius Del Gesu / Catalogue descriptif de leurs instrument -  Charles-Eugene Gand
 
 
 Walter Hamma, Meister Italienischer Geigenbaukunst'', Wilhelmshaven 1993, 
 
Giuseppe Guarneri del Gesú, Carlos Chiesa, John Dilworth, Roger Graham Hargrave, Stewart Pollens, Duane Rosengard & Eric Wen, Peter Biddulph, London, 1998.
Tarisio and ‘Le Messie’ : Antoine Vidal, Bowed Instruments (Vol. I)
W.E. Hill & Sons, Antonio Stradivari: His Life & Work, monograph on the “Salabue” Strad and finally Farga, Violins & Violinists.
On Old Violins - Lucien Greilsamer, Jay C. Freeman and Theodore Baker
The Hill Collection – David D. Boyden
Antonio Stradivari – Henley
1690 &1716  Tuscan & Le Messie – Hill
Violin Iconography of Antonio Stradivari -  Hebert K. Goodkind
How Many Strads – E. Doring
Antonio Stradivari - Charles Beare
Italian Violin Makers – Walter Henley

1833 births
1897 deaths
English collectors
Violin dealers
Businesspeople from Glasgow
19th-century Scottish businesspeople